Rondinelly de Andrade Silva (born 8 February 1991) is a Brazilian professional footballer who plays as an attacking midfielder for Santo André.

Honours
Palmeiras
Campeonato Brasileiro Série B: 2013

References

External links
 
 Rondinelly profile. Goal.
 

1991 births
Living people
Sportspeople from Goiás
Association football midfielders
Brazilian footballers
Vila Nova Futebol Clube players
Itumbiara Esporte Clube players
Grêmio Foot-Ball Porto Alegrense players
Sociedade Esportiva Palmeiras players
Associação Portuguesa de Desportos players
Campeonato Brasileiro Série A players
Campeonato Brasileiro Série B players